Kondoa is a genus of mostly small, air-breathing land snails, terrestrial pulmonate gastropod mollusks in the family Zonitidae.

Species
Species within the genus Kondoa include:
 Kondoa kondorum

See also
  — unrelated political division of Tanzania.

References

 Nomenclator Zoologicus.com: information on Kondoa

 
Gastropod genera
Taxonomy articles created by Polbot